Etlingera albolutea is a monocotyledonous plant species described by Axel Dalberg Poulsen and John Donald Mood. Etlingera albolutea is part of the genus Etlingera and the family Zingiberaceae. No subspecies are listed in the Catalog of Life.

References

albolutea